Robert Boutilier (born 1971 in Halifax County) is a Canadian animator, director, writer, and storyboard artist. He is best known as the creator of Kid vs. Kat and a co-creator of The Snoopy Show. Before working in animation, he wanted to create a daily comic strip, being influenced from Peanuts creator Charles M. Schulz. Boutilier went to Vancouver Film School in 1996, as well as the University of King's College. He is also an employer of DHX Media in Vancouver, British Columbia.

Filmography

Director
 Kid vs. Kat (2008-2011)
 Packages from Planet X (2013-2014)
 Supernoobs (2015-2019)
 Chuck's Choice (2017)
 Snoopy in Space (2019)
 Dorg Van Dango (2019)
 The Snoopy Show (2021-present)

Writer
 Ed, Edd n Eddy (1999)

Art Department
Pound Puppies (storyboard artist)
Pucca (storyboard artist)
The Legend of Frosty the Snowman (storyboard artist)
Being Ian (storyboard artist)
Yakkity Yak (storyboard artist)
The New Woody Woodpecker Show (storyboard artist)
Ed, Edd n Eddy (storyboard artist)
Yvon of the Yukon (storyboard artist)
Ralph Breaks the Internet (storyboard artist)

External links
 

Canadian animated film directors
Canadian storyboard artists
1971 births
People from the Halifax Regional Municipality
Living people
Canadian television directors
Canadian television writers
Canadian male television writers